Jonathan Johansson (born June 30, 1991) is a retired Swedish professional ice hockey centre, who formerly played for Frölunda HC of the SHL , Mora IK in the HockeyAllsvenskan as well as  Kallinge/Ronneby IF & Kristianstads IK of the Hockeyettan, which is the third highest-level league in Sweden. He joined Ronneby after three seasons with Mora IK. Johansson also spent one season overseas in Canada, where he played for the Brampton Battalion of the Ontario Hockey League. Internationally, Johansson played games for Sweden’s national team at both the U18 and U19 Level.

Career statistics

Regular season and playoffs

International

References

External links

1991 births
Living people
Brampton Battalion players
Frölunda HC players
Mora IK players
Swedish ice hockey centres
Ice hockey people from Gothenburg